Francis J. Taylor (born 2 September 1942) is a British boxer. He competed in the men's bantamweight event at the 1960 Summer Olympics. He fought as Frankie Taylor.

He won the 1960 Amateur Boxing Association British bantamweight title, when boxing out of the Lancaster Lads ABC.

References

External links
 

1942 births
Living people
British male boxers
Olympic boxers of Great Britain
Boxers at the 1960 Summer Olympics
Sportspeople from Lancaster, Lancashire
Bantamweight boxers